There are three species of lizard native to Africa named southern tree agama:

 Acanthocercus atricollis
 Acanthocercus gregorii
 Acanthocercus minutus